Crystal Township is the name of two locations in the U.S. state of Michigan:

 Crystal Township, Montcalm County, Michigan
 Crystal Township, Oceana County, Michigan

See also 
 Crystal Township (disambiguation)

Michigan township disambiguation pages